Munster Rebellion may refer to:
 Münster rebellion, Germany, in 1534–1535 
 Desmond Rebellions, Munster, Ireland, in 1569–1573 and 1579–1583

See also
 Münster Feud, 1450–57 dispute over the appointment to the bishop's throne in Münster 
 Munster Republic, nickname for the 1922 anti-Treaty stronghold during the Irish Civil War